The Christmas Tree is a 1996 American made-for-television Christmas drama film directed by Sally Field, starring Julie Harris and Andrew McCarthy and produced by Walt Disney Television which premiered on ABC on December 22, 1996.

Plot
A story about a forming friendship between an elderly nun, Sister Anthony (Julie Harris), and New York's Rockefeller Center's head gardener Richard Reilly (Andrew McCarthy), who wants to fell a tree which she has been growing for decades and move it to New York City for Christmas display.

Cast
Julie Harris as Sister Anthony
Andrew McCarthy as Richard Reilly
Trini Alvarado as Beth
Betty Aberlin as Sister Sarah
Jessica Hecht as Sister Mary
Anne Pitoniak as Mother Superior Frances
Colin Quinn as Tom

Suzi Hofrichter as Anna
Imogene Bliss as Sister Lucia
Therese Courtney as Mother Superior (1939)
Lulee Fisher as Sister Rose
Shannon Holt as Sister Lucia (1939 / 1959)
Lynne Innerst as Sister Frances
Chad Luberger as Roy
Kathleen McEntee as Sister Margaret
Zachary Mott as Anna's Father
Beverly Owings as Matron of the Orphanage
Jaime Shapiro as Doreen
Daniel Sweazen as Helicopter Pilot
Katherine Sweeney as Terry
Cornell J. Wallace as Harvey / Workman
Dave Whalen as Sven
Nili Bassman as Anna (age 18)

Release
The Christmas Tree had international release under several titles: In France as Arbre de Noël, L' Canada, In Spain as Árbol de Navidad, El Spain, in Brazil as A Árvore de Natal Brazil (Portuguese), in Greece as Dentro ton Hristougennon, To Greece, and in Germany as Der Weihnachtsbaum. It was made available in October 2001 on VHS in Spanish and English.

See also 
 List of Christmas films

References

External links

1996 television films
1996 films
1990s Christmas drama films
American Christmas drama films
Christmas television films
Films about Catholic nuns
Films about trees
Films directed by Sally Field
Disney television films
1990s English-language films
1990s American films